Bandages is the sixth studio album by psychedelic rock group, the Edgar Broughton Band. This was the first album to be made after the band's departure from Harvest Records. It was originally released as "NEMS NEL 6006" in 1976. The album was reissued in 2006.

Track listing 
All tracks composed by Edgar Broughton; except where indicated
Side one
"Get a Rise" – 4:59
"Speak Down the Wires" – 3:13
"John Wayne" – 3:10
"The Whale" – 5:34
"Germany" – 4:33
"Love Gang" (Edgar Broughton, Steve Broughton) – 2:54

Side two
"One to Seven" – 5:07
"Lady Life" – 3:06
"Signal Injector" – 4:02
"Frühling Flowers (For Claudia)" (Steve Broughton) – 5:02
"I Want to Lie" (Edgar Broughton, Arthur Grant) – 4:36

Personnel 
Adapted from AllMusic.
Edgar Broughton Band
Edgar Broughton – lead vocals, guitar, bass, banjo, harmonica, acoustic guitars, mandolin, Moog
Arthur Grant – vocals, bass, acoustic guitars, organ, bowed bass guitar, bass Moog
Steve Broughton – vocals, drums, piano, tambourine, bass, acoustic guitar, harpsichord, bells, maracas, timbales, jawbone, marimba
"Creepy" John Thomas – vocals, guitar
Guest musicians
Lei Aloah Mei – backing vocals
Pete Knutsen – keyboards
Mike Oldfield – dulcimer, harp, ARP, steel guitar
Stuart "Digger" Davies – rhythm guitar on "John Wayne"
Production 
Bjørn Lillehagen - engineer
Paschal Byrne – digital remastering
Hugh Gilmour	– package design
Mark Powell –	liner notes, project coordinator

References

Edgar Broughton Band albums
1976 albums